A trumpet is a brass musical instrument.

Trumpet or The Trumpet may also refer to:

Objects
 The characteristic call of any brass instrument
 Ear trumpet, a device for assisting hearing

Geography
 Trumpet, Herefordshire, a village
 Trumpet interchange, a kind of road interchange
 Trumpet (satellite), a series of three reconnaissance satellites

Media

Books and magazines
 Trumpet (novel), a novel by Jackie Kay
 The Philadelphia Trumpet, a monthly news magazine published by the Philadelphia Church of God; thetrumpet.com
 Gideon's Trumpet, a book by Anthony Lewis, published in 1965
 Trumpet of the Swan by E. B. White

Film
 The Trumpet, part of the film project Ten Minutes Older

Music
 Trumpet Concerto (disambiguation)
 Trumpet (organ stop)
 "Trumpets" (Jason Derulo song), 2013 
 "Trumpets" (Sak Noel and Salvi song), 2016

See also
 Trumpet tree (disambiguation)
 
 Gabriel's Horn, also known as Torricelli's trumpet; a three-dimensional geometric figure
 Elephant communication
 Trumpeter (disambiguation)
 La Trompette (disambiguation)